The 38th SS-Grenadier-Division "Nibelungen" was a Waffen-SS formation of Nazi Germany during World War II.

History 
The 38th SS-Grenadier Division 'Nibelungen' was formed in April 1945 from the Junker School in Bad Tölz, Bavaria with three SS grenadier regiments.  The division consisted of personnel drawn from the 6th SS Mountain Division Nord, 7th SS Volunteer Mountain Division Prinz Eugen, and 30th Waffen Grenadier Division of the SS (1st Belarussian).  There were also two battalions of border guards, an element of the Reichsführer-SS escort battalion, and a cadre of local Hitler Youth.

The division reached a strength of around 5,000 men, with the divisional battalions available in platoon or company strength.  On 16 April 1945 the 6th SS Anti-Tank Battalion of 6th SS Mountain Division Nord was reorganised as the 38th SS Anti-Tank Battalion and incorporated into the new division. The SS Artillery Training Regiment in Benešov was reorganised as the 38th SS Artillery Regiment and incorporated shortly thereafter.

On 17 April 1945, the division moved to Titisee-Neustadt in Gau Württemberg-Hohenzollern, and then to Dachau, Bavaria without any previous training in the divisional framework.  Here the units of the division were assigned to the XIII SS Army Corps and relocated to the Danube Front, where they arrived on 21 April.  The next day, American troops captured Neumarkt in der Oberpfalz in the Upper Palatinate and pushed German units back onto the Danube, where they still held bridgeheads.  Here the division was reinforced by a light artillery division of the 26th Waffen Grenadier Division of the SS (2nd Hungarian).

Until 28 April, the division offered fierce resistance to the advancing Americans, before the bulk of XIII SS Army Corps moved south towards Landshut, where the new defensive front was formed as the Isar river.  A combat group made up of members of the French SS Grenadier Training and Replacement Battalion joined the division in Moosburg an der Isar.  At the beginning of May, the division withdrew via Wasserburg am Bodensee and Lake Chiemsee towards Traunstein, only to surrender to American troops on 8 May 1945 in Reit im Winkl.

Composition 
The following units served in the division:

 Divisional Staff
 38th SS Signal Company
 95th SS Grenadier Regiment
 96th SS Grenadier Regiment
 97th SS Grenadier Regiment
 2 x Border Guard Battalions
 Reichsführer-SS Escort Battalion
 Hitler Youth Division
 38th SS Artillery Regiment
 38th SS Anti-Tank Division
 38th SS Engineer Company
 38th SS Divisional Supply Troops

Commanders
Commanders of the division included:

 Standartenführer Hans Kempin (1 March 1945 – 27 March 1945)
 Obersturmbannführer Richard Schulze-Kossens (27 March 1945 – 12 April 1945)
 Brigadeführer Martin Stange (12 April 1945 – surrender)

See also
List of German divisions in World War II
List of Waffen-SS divisions
List of SS personnel

References

Citations

Bibliography
 
 

38
Military units and formations established in 1945
Infantry divisions of the Waffen-SS
Military units and formations disestablished in 1945